Féraud de Nice ( in Chorges – 1044), was Bishop of Gap, France 1000–1044.

970s births
Date of birth unknown
1044 deaths
Date of death unknown
Bishops of Gap
People from Hautes-Alpes
11th-century French Roman Catholic bishops